Viktor Omelyanovich (born 13 April 1958 in Dnipropetrovsk) is a Ukrainian rower who competed for the Soviet Union in the 1988 Summer Olympics.

References 
 
 

1958 births
Living people
Sportspeople from Dnipro
Ukrainian male rowers
Soviet male rowers
Rowers at the 1988 Summer Olympics
Olympic silver medalists for the Soviet Union
Olympic rowers of the Soviet Union
Olympic medalists in rowing
World Rowing Championships medalists for the Soviet Union
Medalists at the 1988 Summer Olympics